Kokuhaku may refer to:

 "Kokuhaku" (Idoling!!! song), 2008
 "Kokuhaku" (Angela Aki song), 2012
 Kokuhaku (album), a 2010 album by Chatmonchy
 Confessions (2010 film) or Kokuhaku, a Japanese drama film